The 2016–17 season was FC Midtjylland's 17th consecutive season in the Danish Superliga. Midtjylland participated in the Europa League this season, after finishing 3rd in the 2015–16 Danish Superliga.

For the 2nd consecutive season, Midtjylland U-19 competed in the UEFA Youth League.

Squad

Out on loan

Transfers

Summer

In:

Out:

Winter

In:

Out:

Friendlies

Competitions

Danish Superliga

League tables

Results summary

Results

European play-off final

Danish Cup

UEFA Europa League

Squad statistics
As of Match played 19 March 2017

Appearances and goals

|-
|colspan="14"|Players who left Midtjylland during the season:

|-
|colspan="14"|Players away from the club on loan:

|}

Goal scorers

Disciplinary record

References

FC Midtjylland seasons
Midtjylland
Midtjylland